Joseph "Joey" or "Joe" Speca (born Highlandtown, Baltimore, Maryland) is a former U.S. soccer player.  Speca played a single season in both the National Professional Soccer League (NPSL) and the North American Soccer League (NASL).  He also earned three caps with the United States.

Youth
Speca grew up in Baltimore, playing soccer first at  Patterson Senior High School then the College of Mount St. Joseph.

Professional career
Speca began his professional career with Baltimore Pompei.  He then played for Baltimore St. Gerards, American Soccer League champions of 1966-67.  In 1967, Speca signed with the Baltimore Bays of the National Professional Soccer League.  He was one of only three native-born U.S. players in the league.  In 1968, the NPSL merged with the United Soccer Association to form the North American Soccer League.  Speca then spent the 1968 season with the Bays in the NASL.

National team
In 1959, Speca was selected for the U.S. roster at the 1959 Pan American Games.  In 1960, he earned his first of three caps with the U.S. national team in a 3-3 tie with Mexico in a World Cup qualifier.  He did not play again for the national team until September 15, 1968 when he came on for Eddie Clear in a 3-3 tie with Israel.  His last game came ten days later in a 4-0 loss to Israel.  In this game, he came on for Helmut Kofler.

In 1995, Speca was inducted into the Old Timers Soccer hall of Fame.  In May 2007, inducted into the Maryland Athletic Hall of Fame.

References

External links
 NASL stats

1937 births
Living people
American Soccer League (1933–1983) players
American soccer coaches
American soccer players
Association football defenders
Baltimore Bays players
Baltimore Pompei players
Footballers at the 1959 Pan American Games
Mount St. Joseph University alumni
National Professional Soccer League (1967) players
North American Soccer League (1968–1984) coaches
North American Soccer League (1968–1984) players
Pan American Games bronze medalists for the United States
Pan American Games medalists in football
Soccer players from Baltimore
United States men's international soccer players
Medalists at the 1959 Pan American Games